Puwa Khola Hydropower Station (Nepali: पुवा खोला जलविद्युत आयोजना) is a run-of-river hydro-electric plant located in  Ilam District of Nepal. The flow from Puwa River, a tributary of Mai Khola, is used to generate 6.2 MW electricity.  The plant is owned and developed by Nepal Electricity Authority, a government owned public company. The plant started generating electricity since 2060-12-22 BS. The generation licence will expire in 2101-12-30 BS, after which the plant will be handed over to the government. The power station is connected to the national grid.

See also
List of power stations in Nepal

References

Hydroelectric power stations in Nepal
Gravity dams
Run-of-the-river power stations
Dams in Nepal
Irrigation in Nepal
Buildings and structures in Ilam District